Reserve is a city in Brown County, Kansas, United States.  As of the 2020 census, the population of the city was 67.  It is located approximately 1.5 miles south of the Nebraska-Kansas border.

History
A post office was opened in Reserve in 1882, and remained in operation until it was discontinued in 1983. The community was named from its location on a former Indian reservation.

Geography
Reserve is located at  (39.976378, -95.564464).

Demographics

2010 census
As of the census of 2010, there were 84 people, 36 households, and 20 families residing in the city. The racial makeup of the city was 79.8% White, 1.2% African American, 13.1% Native American, and 6.0% from two or more races.

There were 36 households, of which 27.8% had children under the age of 18 living with them, 47.2% were married couples living together, 5.6% had a female householder with no husband present, 2.8% had a male householder with no wife present, and 44.4% were non-families. 33.3% of all households were made up of individuals, and 11.1% had someone living alone who was 65 years of age or older. The average household size was 2.33 and the average family size was 3.15.

The median age in the city was 44.5 years. 27.4% of residents were under the age of 18; 2.4% were between the ages of 18 and 24; 20.3% were from 25 to 44; 38% were from 45 to 64; and 11.9% were 65 years of age or older. The gender makeup of the city was 45.2% male and 54.8% female.

2000 census
As of the census of 2000, there were 100 people, 50 households, and 21 families residing in the city. The racial makeup of the city was 82.00% White, 1.00% African American, 16.00% Native American, and 1.00% from two or more races.

There were 50 households, out of which 24.0% had children under the age of 18 living with them, 34.0% were married couples living together, 6.0% had a female householder with no husband present, and 58.0% were non-families. 48.0% of all households were made up of individuals, and 22.0% had someone living alone who was 65 years of age or older. The average household size was 2.00 and the average family size was 3.10.

In the city, the population was spread out, with 22.0% under the age of 18, 8.0% from 18 to 24, 28.0% from 25 to 44, 21.0% from 45 to 64, and 21.0% who were 65 years of age or older. The median age was 42 years. For every 100 females, there were 122.2 males. For every 100 females age 18 and over, there were 122.9 males.

The median income for a household in the city was $13,333, and the median income for a family was $28,125. Males had a median income of $22,188 versus $18,958 for females. The per capita income for the city was $12,343. There were 6.7% of families and 24.7% of the population living below the poverty line, including no under eighteens and 42.9% of those over 64.

Education
Reserve is a part of USD 415 Hiawatha Schools. The Hiawatha High School mascot is Hiawatha Hawks.

Reserve schools were closed through school unification. The Reserve High School mascot was Reserve Elks.

References

External links
 Reserve - Directory of Public Officials
 USD 415, local school district
 Reserve city map, KDOT

Cities in Kansas
Cities in Brown County, Kansas
1882 establishments in Kansas
Populated places established in 1882